Kylie Sonique Love (born May 2, 1983), formerly known as Sonique, is an American entertainer, singer, dancer, model and reality television personality. She rose to prominence as a contestant on the second season of RuPaul's Drag Race in 2010, and achieved further popularity by winning the sixth season of RuPaul's Drag Race All Stars eleven years later in 2021. Love was the first person to ever come out as transgender on any reality TV show. Upon winning All Stars 6, Love became the second transgender winner in the Drag Race franchise and was the first trans woman to win an American series of Drag Race. 
Additionally, in 2020, she co-hosted Translation Season 1, the first talk show on a major network hosted by an all-trans cast. Her first single, "Santa, Please Come Home", was released in 2018.

Early life 
Kylie Sonique Love was born on May 2, 1983 in Albany, Georgia. She came out as transgender to her mother at 15 and later was sent to military school Fort Stewart to become "more masculine". She received a GED at the Albany Technical College. Her "drag mother" is retired Atlanta performer The Goddess Raven, a national pageant titleholder.

Career

Drag 

Love was announced to be one of twelve contestants for the second season of RuPaul's Drag Race on February 1, 2010. She was placed in the bottom two in episode four and was eliminated after losing a lip sync to "Two of Hearts" by Stacey Q against Morgan McMichaels. She later revealed that she is a transgender woman during the reunion episode of that season. In 2015, Love was one of the 30 performers that appeared as a backup dancer for Miley Cyruss Video Music Awards performance.

In June 2018, Love was a backup dancer with McMichaels and Farrah Moan for Christina Aguilera at Los Angeles Pride. She subsequently appeared in the RuPaul's Drag Race Holi-slay Spectacular with seven other Drag Race alumni on December 7, 2018. She also appeared as a guest for the first challenge in the premiere episode of season eleven of Drag Race. Love appeared in a music video for Lizzo's song "Juice", which was released on April 17, 2019.

In 2020, Love co-hosted Translation on Out TV, the first talk show on a major network to be hosted by an all-trans cast. Love was announced as one of thirteen contestants competing on the sixth season of RuPaul's Drag Race All Stars on May 26, 2021, where she competed under the name Kylie Sonique Love, after previously competing under the mononym Sonique. On September 2, she was announced as the winner, becoming the first transgender winner in a 
U.S. version of the show.

Music 
Kylie contributed to Tammie Brown's 2018 EP A Little Bit of Tammie. She released her first single, "Santa, Please Come Home", the same day as the premiere of the Holi-slay Spectacular. She released her second single, "Hey Hater", on April 24, 2019.

Other ventures 
In June 2022, she was a featured model for Playful Promises' lingerie Pride Campaign.

Filmography

Film

Television

Music videos

Web series

Discography

EPs

Singles

As lead artist

As featured artist

Awards and nominations

References

External links
Instagram
YouTube Channel
Twitter

1983 births
Living people
American drag queens
LGBT people from Georgia (U.S. state)
People from Atlanta
Kylie Sonique Love
Transgender women
Transgender drag performers
Kylie Sonique Love